This is an alphabetical list of villages in Ariyalur district, Tamil Nadu, India.

A 

 Adhanakurichi
 Alagapuram
 Alagiyamanavalam
 Alanduraiyarkattalai
 Alathiyur
 Amanakkanthondi
 Ammbappur
 Ammenabath
 Anaikudam
 Anandavadi
 Andimadam
 Andipattakkadu
 Anganur
 Angarayanallur (East)
 Anikudichan (North)
 Anikudichan (South)
 Annimangalam
 Ariyalur (North)
 Arungal
 Asaveerankudikkadu
 Authukurichi
 Avansuthamalli
 Ayanathathanur
 Ayanathur
 Ayyappa Nayakan Pettai
 Ayyur

C–E 

 Chinnapattakadu
 Cholamadevi
 Devamangalam
 Devanur
 Edaayankurichi
 Edanganni
 Edayar
 Edayathankudi
 Elaiyur
 Elaiyur (East)
 Elaiyur (West)
 Elakurichi
 Elandakudam
 Elayaperumalnallur
 Eravangudy

G–I 

 Govindapuram
 Govindaputhur
 Guruvadi
 Guruvalapparkovil
 Illuppaiyur
 Irugaiyur
 Irumbilikurichi

K 
*Kallathur
 Kadambur
 Kadugur
 Kallankurichi
 Kamarasavalli
 Kandiratheertham
 Karaikurichi
 Karaiyavetti
 Karuppilakattalai
 Karuppur
 Kattagaram (North)
 Kattagaram (South)
 Kattathur (North)
 Kattathur (South)
 Kavanur
 Kayarlabath
 Keelakolathur
 Keelakudiyiruppu
 Keelanatham
 Keezhakavattankurichi
 Keezhamaligai
 Keezhapalur
 Kilimangalam
 Kodalikaruppur
 Kodangudi (North)
 Kodangudi (South)
 Kodukkur
 Koluthunganallur
 Koovathur (North)
 Koovathur (South)
 Kovil Esanai (East)
 Kovil Esanai (West)
 Kovilur
 Kulamanickam (West)
 Kulumur
 Kundaveli (East)
 Kundaveli (West)
 Kuvagam
 Kuzhavadaiyan

M–O 

 Mallur
 Managethi
 Manakkudaiyan
 Manapathur
 Manjamedu
 Melapalur
 Muthuservamadam
 Naduvalur (East)
 Naduvalur (West)
 Nagalkuzhi
 Nagamangalam
 Nakkampadi
 Namangunam
 Nayaganaipriyal
 Olaiyur
 Oriyur
 Ottakoil

P 

 Palinganatham
 Papanacheri
 Pappakudi (North)
 Pappakudi (South)
 Paranam
 Parukkal (East)
 Parukkal (West)
 Periakrishnapuram
 Periyakurichi
 Periyanagalur
 Periyathirukonam
 Periyavalayam
 Pilakurichi
 Pilichikuzhi
 Pirancheri
 Pitchanur
 Ponparappi
 Pottaveli
 Pudukkottai Village
 Pungankuzhi
.  Pallividai

R–S 

 Ramanallur
 Rangiyam
 Rayampuram
 Reddipalayam
 Sannasinallur
 Sannavur (North)
 Sannavur (South)
 Sathamangalam
 Sathambadi
 Sengunthapuram
 Sennivanam
 Silumbur (North)
 Silumbur (South)
 Siluvaicheri
 Sirkalathur
 Sirukadambur
 Siruvalur (Ariyalur)
 Sooriyamanal
 Sripurandan (North)
 Sripurandan (South)
 Sriraman
 Sullangudi
 Suthamalli

T 

 Thalavoi (North)
 Thalavoi (South)
 Thaluthalaimedu
 Thandalai
 Thathanur (East)
 Thathanur (West)
 Thelur
 Thenkatchiperumalnatham
 Thirukalappur
 Thirumanur
 Thirumazhapadi
 Thuthur
 Tular

U–V 

 Udayanatham (East)
 Udayanatham (West)
 Udayarpalayam R.F.
 Udayavarthinayur
 Uliyankudi
 Ulkottai (North)
 Ulkottai (South)
 Unjini
 Vadaveekam
 Vadugapalayam
 Valaikurichi
 Valajanagaram
 Vanathirayanpattinam
 Vangudi
 Vanjinapuram
 Varanavasi
 Variyankaval
 Vathiyur
 Vembukudi
 Venmankondan (East)
 Venmankondan (West)
 Vethiyarvettu
 Vilandhai
 Vilupanankurichi

Ariyalur district